Inspection Tour System of Nepal known as Daudaha( Devnagri:दौडाहा) was a supervision system mainly implemented during Rana era between 1846 and 1950. The significance of Daudaha tour was to travel and check into all aspects of government activities and investigate certain conditions within a certain district. The main purpose of Daudaha was to maintain law-and-order in farthest unreached districts of the Nepal along with investigating if the implication of Muluki Ain (code of conduct) was properly done or not. Daudaha trips were on average 3 to 4 months long.

History
Inspection Tour System, i.e., Daudaha System(Nepal)  has a long history in Nepal  Even during   Licchavi , Malla  and Early Shah period certain administrative and inspection tours were made in different provinces but it was the Rana period , where the system was extensively used as a way to govern The Kingdom of Nepal.

Structure of daudaha team
Generally each daudaha team had soldiers, official clerks and one leader (hakim) appointed by Prime Minister Maharaja himself. The structure of Gaudaha team depended upon the stature of the leader. The leaders were generally from Non Rolwall Rana family and commoner but some times from High Rollwala Rana family members.

Non Rollwala Rana or commoner as leader
 Team had nine members: five official Kathmandu court clerks, three other clerks and one leader. The leader (Hakim) was appointed by Prime Minister Maharaja himself, thus accountable to the PM only.
 23 soldiers for security and assistance. Each member of the team was allotted five months' salary in advance.
 Five volumes of Muluki Ain (code of conduct) handed to the court official of the team
 Mode of transportation elephants, horses; depending upon the terrain of the route
 Transportation allowances for rail-fare to travel through India (road network in Nepal was not developed).

Rollwala Rana as a leader
In every 2 to 3 years a high level Rollwala Rana was appointed as leader for certain daudaha team. Lavish preparations were made for the daudaha as these daudaha were also a hunting trip.
 Team were made up of around 400–500 members (100 officials, servants, hunters, elephant drivers and 300–400 soldiers)
 Arrangements were made with local tradesman for buying provisions for 4–5 hundred people along the route of the daudaha.
 Establishment of temporary army outpost and chaukis
 Arrangements to buy water buffalo as a bait for tiger hunting.
 Building and expansion of roads for vehicular traffic for high level Rana.

Types Of Daudaha
Daudaha can be generalized into four basic types based upon the purpose of conducting it.

Intra-District
Intra-District Daudaha were the Daudahas conducted by local Bada Hakim(Chief District Officer) of a certain district within his own jurisdiction area. It was mandatory for bada hakim to organize Daudaha within his district at least once a year and if failed make a tour during the winter drought season all his allowances or one-third of his salary was to be stopped.

Central Daudaha to Districts
Central sent Daudaha' to Districts were the general tour conducted by Center (Capital) by sending an appointed Hakim (Leader) along with other officers for inspecting local officials and to receive complains from local residences about public servants including the District chief Bada Hakim. These tours were crucial in order to crack down conflicts, violation of law by officials, along with mishandling of state treasury.

Special Daudaha
Special Daudaha were the tours conducted by Center(Capital) by sending an appointed Hakim(Leader) along with other officers for assisting local officers for sudden or periodic assistances in specific government tasks.

Fact-finding Daudaha
Fact-finding Daudaha were the tours conducted by Center(Capital) by sending an appointed Hakim along with other officers for investing general condition and prospect of certain areas for making recommendation to the central Government in order to make necessary provisions or changes in local law. These Daudaha were even responsible for making recommendations regarding public construction projects like road, bridges and other infrastructures.

Legacy
King Mahendra revived the Daudaha system in late 60s by traveling himself with officials to remote parts of Nepal.

See also
Pajani System
Rolls of Succession in Rana (Nepal)
Rana Administrative System (Nepal)

References 

History of Nepal